is a Japanese video game development company. Formed by ex-Capcom staff in May 1996, they are best known for developing games in the Mega Man series, namely the Mega Man Zero and Mega Man ZX series, and their flagship Azure Striker Gunvolt and Gal Gun franchises.

History
It was formed by ten former members of Capcom with Takuya Aizu as the CEO. First starting in Chiba Prefecture, they expanded by opening a studio in Nagoya in 2008. First starting as a Limited liability company, they became a publicly traded company in 2003. As of 2018, they have approximately 100 staff members.

They are best known as the developers of the Mega Man Zero and Mega Man ZX series.

They have also published several music albums composed and arranged by III, whose members are Ippo Yamada, Ryo Kawakami, Luna Umegaki, Tsutomu Kurihara, and Masaki Suzuki, amongst others. On August 29, 2014, they released their first self-published games Azure Striker Gunvolt and its cross-promotion Mighty Gunvolt.

Inti Creates has provided portrait artwork for multiple entries in WayForward's Shantae series.

They worked with Keiji Inafune and his design studio Comcept on the game Mighty No. 9. Comcept worked on the design and story of the game, while Inti Creates developed it. Later, they worked with producer Koji Igarashi on the game Bloodstained: Ritual of the Night, however, they left the project and were replaced by Dico after E3 2016. They later released the 2D platformer Bloodstained: Curse of the Moon in 2018. The game attained more than 100,000 downloads in its first week.

Games

Games developed

Games developed and published

References

External links

Video game companies of Japan
Video game development companies
Video game publishers
Video game companies established in 1996
Companies based in Chiba Prefecture
Japanese companies established in 1996